Lawrence Paros (born 21 February 1934) is an author and high school teacher, best known for his work in alternative education.

Biography 

Paros was born in Springfield, Massachusetts in 1934. He received a B.A. in History and Political Science at University of Massachusetts in Amherst. In 1958, Paros received an M.A. in American Diplomatic History and Russian Studies at Yale University.

Career 
Paros taught high school in many areas before becoming the chairman of the History Department at Wilbur Cross High School in New Haven, Connecticut.  While there, he developed an area-wide program that focused on contemporary issues for high school students. This program was the basis of a featured article in the Yale Alumni Magazine, which described the program and its genesis.Paros was then appointed the director of the Yale Summer High School, a project to identify, recruit and educate talented youths living in poverty nationwide. After forty years, he traveled the country interviewing former students and school staff members. His accomplishments are shown in a film called Walk Right In.

The film was screened at multiple venues, including the Tacoma Film Festival, International Black Film Festival of Nashville, Doc Miami International Film Festival and Show Me Social Justice International Film Festival. It was also displayed at several dozen colleges and universities, including the University of WA and their TV show, Backstory.  and the Harvard Graduate School of Education. It currently exists online at "Culture Unplugged".

 Alternative education 

In Providence, Rhode Island, he created and directed two experimental schools—The Alternate Learning Project (ALP) and  School One.

Central to the schools’ philosophy was an effort to blur and ultimately eradicate the artificial distinction between learning and life. In keeping with the philosophy of "Project-Based Learning," all students held site-placements in the community.

The school was the subject of Hilda Calabro's Diversity or Conformity in the American High School. Written and online work 

Paros’ published works ranging from education and etymology to children's books.

He is the author of Dancing on the Contradictions — a book of transforming our schools, our students, and ourselves. Grounded in real life, rather than abstract theory, it features vivid snapshots of interactions with students — often in their own words — the struggles that they and the author faced together, their resilience, and their mutual transformation.

His other published works include The Black and the Blue: The Story of the Other Yale, The Great American Cliché, The Erotic Tongue (Madrona and Henry Holt and Company), Bawdy Language (Kvetch Press) and Smashcaps, (Avon (publishers)).

His column, A Word with You, was available in the early days of the internet.

The columns later served as the basis of a two volume work: A Word with You America.Bawdy Language is an updated, unexpurgated, expanded, and illustrated version of The Erotic Tongue.

 Ancillary activity 

Paros has been an op-ed page columnist for the Seattle Post-Intelligencer and a commentator on KUOW-FM, the NPR affiliate in Seattle. His most recent works include three films: The Journey, the story of an immigrant's trek to America, Walk Right In, the story of the Yale Summer High School, and a short animated film, "Bawdy: The Movie."

 Bibliography 

 Non-fiction The Great American Cliché (Workman,1976),The Erotic Tongue (Madrona, Henry Holt,1984),Smashcaps (Avon,1995),A Word with you America (Kvetch Press,1999),Bawdy Language (Kvetch Press,2003),Dancing on the Contradictions (PP Press,2019),

 Film/video The JourneyWalk Right InBawdy: The Movie''

References 

Living people
American male writers
Yale University alumni
1934 births
20th-century American educators
Etymologists